Bishop John Joseph Nevins (January 19, 1932 – August 26, 2014) was an American prelate of the Roman Catholic Church.  He served as an auxiliary bishop of the Archdiocese of Miami in Florida from 1979 to 1984 and as the first bishop of the new Diocese of Venice in Florida from 1984 until 2007.

Biography

Early life 
John Nevins was born on January 19, 1932, in New Rochelle, New York.  He received an early education from the Irish Christian Brothers, but was forced to transfer to a seminary for the Fathers of Mercy when the Irish Brothers disbanded. Nevins received a master's degree at Tulane University in New Orleans, then attended Catholic University of America in Washington, D.C.

Nevins was ordained a priest for the Archdiocese of Miami on June 6, 1959 when he was 27 years old.

Auxiliary Bishop of Miami 
On January 25, 1979, Nevins was appointed by Pope John Paul II as auxiliary bishop of Miami and as titular bishop of Rusticiana.  He was consecrated on March 24, 1979 by Archbishop Edward A. McCarthy, Bishop René Gracida, and Bishop John Fitzpatrick.

Bishop of Venice 
On July 17, 1984, Nevins was appointed by John Paul II as the first bishop of the Diocese of Venice in Florida. Nevins was a member of the Order of the Holy Sepulchre.  In 1992, he sponsored a special collection to help Croatians and Bosnians who were suffering from the Bosnia War.  In August 2003, three Florida siblings sued the diocese and Nevins alleging sexual molestation by William Romero, a former priest in the diocese.  Between 1979 and 1982, while in an improper relationship with their mother, Romero sexually abused the three siblings in Hobe Sound, Florida. In November 2005, a St. Petersburg, Florida man filed a lawsuit against Nevins and the diocese, claiming that he was sexually abused as a minor by George E. Brennan, a diocesan priest.  The plaintiff claimed to have been sodomized in 1984 four times at Incarnation Catholic Church in Sarasota.  The suit said that Nevins covered up the alleged crime.

Pope Benedict VI accepted Nevin's resignation as bishop on January 19, 2007.  John Nevins died in Venice on August 26, 2014.  The Bishop Nevins Academy in Sarasota, Florida, is named after him.

Viewpoints

Gambling 
Nevins opposed efforts in 1994 to amend the Florida State Constitution to allow casinos and riverboat gambling, concerned about the potential side effects on people who gambled.

Abortion 
In a 1992 pastoral letter, "Reverence for God and the Human Person," Nevins condemned abortion rights for women Although Americans "live in a pluralistic society," he said, there are not two standards of morality -- there is only one."

References

 Priests Renew Vows, Nevins: 'We're not perfect'''; Sarasota Herald-Tribune - March 27, 2002
 Marching to Orlando; St. Petersburg Times - February 23, 2000
 Bishop Couldn't Offer Safety A Lawyer Argues That Bishop John Nevins Of The Catholic Diocese Of Venice Was Not Negligent; Sarasota Herald-Tribune (FL) - April 17, 1997
 Bishop apologizes for not taking enough action to protect victim; Sarasota Herald-Tribune (FL) - June 19, 2002
 Bishop John Nevins of the Diocese of Venice receives Eternal Light Award Special to the Sun; Charlotte Sun (Port Charlotte, FL) - February 22, 2004
 Division of Dioceses A Challenge''; Miami Herald, The (FL) - October 19, 1984

20th-century Roman Catholic bishops in the United States
21st-century Roman Catholic bishops in the United States
Roman Catholic bishops of Venice in Florida
Roman Catholic Ecclesiastical Province of Miami
1932 births
2014 deaths
Religious leaders from New Rochelle, New York
Catholics from New York (state)
Members of the Order of the Holy Sepulchre